Ditte Hansen (born 6 December 1970, in Copenhagen) is a Danish actress and author known for writing and starring in the TV series Ditte & Louise and its film spin-off as well as her appearances in the Cirkusrevyen.

Early life 
Hansen was born on 6 December 1970 in Copenhagen. She grew up with her father, an alcoholic, where he occasionally abuses her as she attempted to calm down. These events traumatised Hansen, as she sometimes goes to therapy to escape her past while having strong support with her husband.

Career 
Hansen graduated from the School of Acting at the Odense Theater in 1996 and from 1996 to 1998 was employed at the theatre.

Hansen made her film debut in Hella Joof's comedy-drama Oh Happy Day. She made her debut in the Cirkusrevyen in 2006. She hosted the awarding of Reumert of the Year in May 2010 and again in 2011. In 2012, she appeared on television as forensic pathologist in Crime III and various roles in the satire program In the fence on DR1. She hosted the Reumert Awards in May 2010 and again in 2011. In 2012, she appeared on television as forensic pathologist in Forbrydelsen III and various roles in the satirical series I hegnet on DR1. Between 2015 and 2018, she wrote and starred in Ditte & Louise opposite Louise Mieritz, across two seasons and a theatrical film. In 2019, she published the book Gode Kasser.

Private life 
She is married to the actor Benjamin Boe Rasmussen.

Filmography

Films

TV series

Revue and theatre performances

References

External links

1970 births
Living people
Danish actresses
Actresses from Copenhagen
Danish television writers